Anti-communist resistance in Poland can be divided into two types: the armed partisan struggle, mostly led by former Armia Krajowa and Narodowe Siły Zbrojne soldiers, which ended in the late 1950s (see cursed soldiers), and the non-violent, civil resistance struggle that culminated in the creation and victory of the Solidarity trade union.

Armed resistance

 Cursed soldiers
 NIE
 Ruch Oporu Armii Krajowej
 Freedom and Independence
 National Armed Forces  
 National Military Union 
 Konspiracyjne Wojsko Polskie  
 Armia Krajowa Obywatelska 
 Armed Forces Delegation for Poland
 Poznań protests of 1956

Civil resistance
1968 Polish political crisis
1970 Polish protests
Letter of 59
Workers' Defence Committee - Komitet Obrony Robotników, KOR
Movement for Defence of Human and Civic Rights
Solidarity
Polish Round Table Agreement

See also
Polish government-in-exile

External links
Polish Underground Soldiers 1944-1963 - The Untold Story

Anti-communism in Poland
Anti-communist resistance movements in Eastern Europe
Polish dissident organisations